Terminal 5 was an art exhibition that took place in October 2004 at the then disused Eero Saarinen–designed TWA Flight Center at JFK Airport in Queens, New York. The City of New York had designated both the interiors and the exteriors of the Saarinen terminal a historic landmark in 1994 (the building ultimately to be listed on the National Register of Historic Places), but following TWA's continued financial deterioration during the 1990s and eventual purchase by American Airlines, the Saarinen-designed terminal had ended operations in October 2001 and entered a period of disuse.

Curated by Rachel K. Ward, Terminal 5 showed the work of 19 artists from 10 countries including Jenny Holzer, Scott Indrisek, Dan Graham, Vanessa Beecroft, Tom Sachs, Tobias Wong, Douglas Coupland, Mark Handforth, Anri Sala, Sean Linezo, Jonas Mekas, Aleksandra Mir, Jonathan Monk, Toland Grinnell, Kendell Geers, Ryoji Ikeda, and Jennifer & Kevin McCoy. The exhibit included sculptures, audio installations, lectures and temporary installations drawing inspiration from the idea of travel as well as the terminal's architecture.

Originally planned to run from October 1, 2004 to January 31, 2005, it closed abruptly after the opening event when a runway-side door was opened by a guest, thereby breaching airport security and creating a public risk. Since the exhibition, portions of the original complex have been demolished, and the Saarinen terminal (or head house) has been renovated, partially encircled by and serving as a ceremonial entrance to a new adjacent terminal completed in 2008. Together, the old and new buildings comprise JetBlue Airways' JFK operations and are known collectively as Terminal 5 or simply T5 — from which the exhibit derived its name.

Terminal 5 was selected for Artforum's "Best of 2004".

References

External links 
Terminal 5: Interview with Rachel K. Ward by John Casey
Terminal 5: Exhibition images

Installation art
Cultural history of New York City
2004 works
Public art in New York City
2004 in New York City
John F. Kennedy International Airport